Green Bay Area Public School District (GBAPS) is the fourth largest school district in Wisconsin. As of the 2020-2021 school year, GBAPS served more than 21,000 students in 36 schools and had 3,641 full-time equivalent (FTE) staff positions. A publicly elected school board, the Green Bay Area Public School Board of Education, provides direction and oversight, with a superintendent heading the organization's administration.

Green Bay Area Public Schools' offerings include neighborhood schools, specialty schools and charter schools serving students as young as age 3 up through grade 12.

The district was founded in 1856, with the founding of the first public school, Sale School.  Sale School has since been demolished.

Programs 
Specialty programs in GBAPS include arts schools such as Green Bay East High School's Fine Arts Academy; alternative instruction such as Aldo Leopold Community School, Dr. Rosa Minoka-Hill School, and the Northeast Wisconsin School of innovation; charter schools including the John Dewey Academy of Learning; and International Baccalaureate schools such as Green Bay West High School.

A multitude of 4K and other early education programs are also offered by the district, as well as afterschool programs.

Performance 
In general, both English Language Arts Achievement and Mathematics Achievement is below the state average according to the Wisconsin Department of Public Instruction's latest district report card, showing that the district received a 47.6/100 score compared to the states 62.3/100 score. These issues are complicated by 59.4% of student's who are classified as Economically Disadvantaged, in addition to 22.3% who are considered English Learners.

Absenteeism and Dropout Rates sit within the state's goal for the district of less than 13%, and less than 6% respectively, with the actual rates being 10.6% and 2.8%.

Elementary schools 

Aldo Leopold Community School
Baird Elementary School
Beaumont Elementary School
Chappell Elementary School
Danz Elementary School
Doty Elementary School
Eisenhower Elementary School
Elmore Elementary School
Fort Howard Elementary School
Howe Elementary School
Jackson Elementary School
Jefferson Elementary School
Keller Elementary School
Kennedy Elementary School
King Elementary School
Langlade Elementary School
Lincoln Elementary School
MacArthur Elementary School
Martin Elementary School
McAuliffe Elementary School
Nicolet Elementary School
Sullivan Elementary School
Tank Elementary School
Webster Elementary School
Wequiock Elementary School
Wilder Elementary School

Middle schools 
Edison Middle School
Franklin Middle School
Leonardo da Vinci School for Learners with Disabilities (K-8)
Lombardi Middle School
Red Smith School (K-8)
Washington Middle School

High schools 
 
Green Bay East High School
Green Bay Southwest High School
Green Bay West High School
Preble High School
John Dewey Academy of Learning(6-12)
Northeast Wisconsin School of Innovation

Alternative schools 
 Dr. Rosa Minoka-Hill School

References

External links
 Official website

School districts in Wisconsin
School districts established in 1856
Education in Green Bay, Wisconsin
1856 establishments in Wisconsin